The Sunda Trench, earlier known as and sometimes still indicated as the Java Trench, is an oceanic trench located in the Indian Ocean near Sumatra, formed where the Australian-Capricorn plates subduct under a part of the Eurasian Plate. Its maximum depth is the deepest point in the Indian Ocean. The trench stretches from the Lesser Sunda Islands past Java, around the southern coast of Sumatra on to the Andaman Islands, and forms the boundary between Indo-Australian Plate and Eurasian plate (more specifically, Sunda Plate). The trench is considered to be part of the Pacific Ring of Fire as well as one of a ring of oceanic trenches around the northern edges of the Australian Plate.

In 2005, scientists found evidence that the 2004 earthquake activity in the area of the Java Trench could lead to further catastrophic shifting within a relatively short period of time, perhaps less than a decade. This threat has resulted in international agreements to establish a tsunami warning system in place along the Indian Ocean coast.

Characteristics 

For about half its length, off of Sumatra, it is divided into two parallel troughs by an underwater ridge, and much of the trench is at least partially filled with sediments.  Mappings after the 2004 Indian Ocean earthquake of the plate boundary showed resemblance to suspension bridge cables, with peaks and sags, indicative of asperity and locked faults, instead of the traditional wedge shape expected.

Exploration 
Some of the earliest exploration of the Trench occurred in the late 1950s when Robert Fisher, Research Geologist at the Scripps Institution of Oceanography, investigated the trench as part of a worldwide scientific field exploration of the world's ocean floor and sub-oceanic crustal-structure. Bomb-sounding, echo-train analysis and manometer were some of the techniques used to determine the depth of the trench. The research contributed to an understanding of the subduction characteristic of the Pacific margins. Various agencies have explored the trench in the aftermath of the 2004 earthquake, and these explorations have revealed extensive changes in the ocean floor.

Crewed descent 

The operating area was surveyed by the support ship, the Deep Submersible Support Vessel DSSV Pressure Drop, with a Kongsberg SIMRAD EM124 multibeam echosounder system. The gathered data will be donated to the GEBCO Seabed 2030 initiative. The dive was part of the Five Deeps Expedition. The objective of this expedition is to thoroughly map and visit the deepest points of all five of the world's oceans by the end of September 2019.

To resolve the debate regarding the deepest point of the Indian Ocean, the Diamantina Fracture Zone was surveyed by the Five Deeps Expedition in March 2019, recording a maximum water depth of  ± at 33°37'52" S, 101°21'14" E for the Dordrecht Deep. This confirmed that the Sunda Trench was indeed deeper than the Diamantina Fracture Zone.

Associated seismicity 
The subduction of the Indo-Australian Plate beneath a bloc of the Eurasian Plate is associated with numerous earthquakes. Several of these earthquakes are notable for their size, associated tsunamis, and/or the number of fatalities they caused.

Sumatra segment 
 1797 Sumatra earthquake: magnitude ~8.4
 1833 Sumatra earthquake: magnitude 8.8–9.2
 1861 Sumatra earthquake: magnitude ~8.5
 1935 Sumatra earthquake: magnitude 7.7
 2000 Enggano earthquake: magnitude 7.9
 2002 Sumatra earthquake: A magnitude 7.3 earthquake that occurred at the boundary between the rupture areas of the 2004 and 2005 earthquakes listed below.
 2004 Indian Ocean earthquake and tsunami: Mw 9.1–9.3
 2005 Nias–Simeulue earthquake: magnitude 8.6
 September 2007 Sumatra earthquakes: Series of earthquakes, the three largest were magnitude 8.5, 7.9 and 7.0.
2008 Simeulue earthquake: magnitude 7.4 near the 2002 event.
 2009 Sumatra earthquakes: magnitude 7.9
 2010 Mentawai earthquake and tsunami: magnitude 7.7

Java segment 
 1917 Bali earthquake: magnitude 6.6
 1994 Java earthquake: magnitude 7.8
 2006 Pangandaran earthquake and tsunami: magnitude 7.7
 2009 West Java earthquake: magnitude 7.0
 2019 Sunda Strait earthquake: magnitude 6.9

See also 
 Banda Arc
 List of islands of Indonesia
 Plate tectonics
 Sunda Arc
 Sunda Islands
 Greater Sunda Islands
 Lesser Sunda Islands
 Sundaland
 Oceanic trench

References

Further reading 
 Špičák, A., V. Hanuš, and J. Vaněk (2007), Earthquake occurrence along the Java trench in front of the onset of the Wadati–Benioff zone: Beginning of a new subduction cycle?, Tectonics, 26, TC1005

Extreme points of Earth
Lowest points of the World Ocean
Oceanic trenches of the Indian Ocean
Geology of Indonesia
Subduction zones